Current Opinion in Food Science is a peer-reviewed scientific journal published by Elsevier. It covers the field of food Science and nutrition, and is divided into themed sections. The journal was established in 2015 as part of Elsevier's Current Opinion series, which is a collection of journals publishing invited reviews aimed at experts and non-specialists on various disciplines. The current editors-in-chief are A.G. Marangoni (University of Guelph) and A. Sant'Ana (State University of Campinas).

Abstracting and Indexing
The journal is abstracted and indexed in Science Citation Index Expanded, Current Contents/Agriculture, Biology & Environmental Sciences, Essential science indicators, and Scopus. According to the Journal Citation Reports, the journal has a 2018 impact factor of 3.828

See also
 Current Opinion (Elsevier)
 Food science

References

External links
 

Elsevier academic journals
Food science journals
Publications established in 2015
English-language journals